System 15000 is a 1984 video game by A.V.S.  It was originally designed, and programmed by Lee Kristofferson (born John Wagstaff) in assembly language for the Commodore 64. Versions were later ported to the ZX Spectrum and BBC Micro, both written in BASIC.  This was the first game to simulate computer hacking.

A sequel was planned by Lee Kristofferson but never released.

Plot
The game box includes a letter which provides background information to establish the premise of the game. Written to the main character from the perspective of a friend "Mike", it outlines how (a presumed mutual friend) Richard's company, Comdata, has had $1.5 million stolen by a rival company named Realco. Furthermore, the police are unable to retrieve the money, so the player is required to hack into a computer system and retrieve the funds. The letter provides a single phone number and entry code, part of the game's simulation of dialing into databases and bulletin boards. The player has to figure out how to get into the proper database to take back the cash.

Release
Advertisements for System 15000 challenged gamers to "Beat It", in reference to the Michael Jackson hit from 1983.

When users enter the System 15000 User Network in the game and select option 1, it lists the then current lineup of AVS games, including Flight Zero-One Five (VIC-20), Whirlwind One-Five (VIC-20) and "15000 Series Games" (CBM 64/BBC B). (All games have the number one and five in them, as does the $1.5 million figure stolen in System 15000.)

See also
Hacker
Neuromancer

References

External links
 
 

1984 video games
BBC Micro and Acorn Electron games
Commodore 64 games
Hacking video games
Puzzle video games
Video games developed in the United Kingdom
ZX Spectrum games